Hayling Island (called South Hayling until 1892) was a station on Hayling Island in southeastern Hampshire, England. It was opened for passengers in 1867 as the terminus of the four and a half mile Hayling Island branch, a single track line from Havant which transported holidaymakers to the resort until its closure in 1963.

The station had a small wooden coal stage used to refill the bunkers of the A1X steam locomotives working the branch. Goods services, including wagons of coal for the locomotives, continued until the last day of operation.

The only part of the station remaining today is the former goods shed which was incorporated into a theatre, and is a landmark on one end of the Hayling Billy Trail.

References

External links
 Hayling Island station on navigable 1946 O. S. map

Disused railway stations in Hampshire
Former London, Brighton and South Coast Railway stations
Railway stations in Great Britain opened in 1867
Railway stations in Great Britain closed in 1963
1869 establishments in England
Hayling Island